21st Century is the ninth album of Blue System. Was published in 1994 by BMG Ariola and produced by Dieter Bohlen.

The album contains 12 new tracks.

Track listing

Personnel
 Dieter Bohlen – lead vocals, producer, arranger, lyrics
 Rolf Köhler – refrain vocals, chorus, bass, drums
 Detlef Wiedeke – chorus, guitar
 Michael Scholz – chorus, keyboards
 Luis Rodriguez – Co-producer, engineering

Charts

Weekly charts

Year-end charts

References

External links

Blue System albums
1994 albums
Bertelsmann Music Group albums
Albums produced by Luis Rodríguez (producer)